Aleksandar Gruev (born July 24, 1983) is a retired Bulgarian professional basketball player.

Professional career
During his career, Gruev has played in Romania, Georgia, Iran and Slovenia.

On 30 September 2014, Gruev signed with Bulgarian champions PBC Lukoil Academic.

External links
 at basketball.eurobasket.com
 at basketball.realgm.com
 at fiba.com
 at eurobasket2011.com
 at balkanleague.net

1983 births
Living people
Bulgarian men's basketball players
Bulgarian expatriate sportspeople in Romania
Bulgarian expatriate sportspeople in Georgia (country)
Bulgarian expatriates in Iran
Bulgarian expatriates in Slovenia
Shooting guards
BC Balkan Botevgrad players
Basketball players from Sofia